Sefidarak (also Romanized as Sefīdārak and Sefīddārak) is a village in Hiv Rural District, in the Central District of Savojbolagh County, Alborz Province, Iran. At the 2006 census, its population was 26, in 10 families.

References 

Populated places in Savojbolagh County